The Rijksakademie van beeldende kunsten (State Academy of Fine Arts) was founded in 1870 in Amsterdam. It is a classical academy, a place where philosophers, academics and artists meet to test and exchange ideas and knowledge. The school supports visual artists with a two-year curriculum.

The Rijksakademie van beeldende kunsten was the home of Amsterdam Impressionism, part of the international impressionist movement, and is known as the School of Allebé by art historians; August Allebé became the school's director in 1880. In French, the school was called "l'Académie Royale des Beaux Arts d'Amsterdam". Among its pioneers here were George Breitner, Jan Toorop, Piet Mondrian, Jacques Witjens and Willem Arnoldus Witsen. Other artists connected with the academy were Hendrik Petrus Berlage, Willem Wiegmans, Constant Nieuwenhuijs, Karel Appel, Corneille, Ger Lataster, Willem Hofhuizen, and Jaap Min.

The school provides an education academically comparable with a university. There are open days each year, which provide an opportunity to see the work of young artists.

1718 to 1869
From 1718 to 1819 Amsterdam had an art school, the Stadstekenacademie. In 1820, the Koninklijke Academie van Beeldende Kunsten continued the artistic tradition. The prevailing style was panel painting in oil, landscape painting influenced by neoclassicism. In 1869, the Amsterdam school received its present name.

Early history

The academy was a place for philosophers, scientists and artists to come together and share knowledge and ideas. In 1870, the academy was founded by King William III as a successor to the 19th-century Koninklijke Academie, the 18th-century Stads Teekenacademie and the 17th-century Konstkamer to give visual artists an educational opportunity. Early students included George Hendrik Breitner, Isaac Israëls and Willem Witsen, who were influenced by Amsterdam Impressionism.

Under director August Allebé, the Saint Luke (patron saint of artists) student movement was founded. Allebé's cosmopolitan attitude changed the school's method of instruction, emphasizing the avant-garde.

Present day
Around 1985, the school received the additional title of Instituut voor Praktijkstudie and offered postdoctoral education. In 1992 it moved into a former cavalry barracks at Sarphatistraat 470 in Amsterdam, and the buildings were renovated. In November 1999, it became an independent art institution. The school is financed by the Ministry of Education and private sponsors. The institute offers workshops with specialized technical personnel and a library focusing on contemporary art and art history. Students receive a scholarship and are offered a studio in which to live. In recent years nearly 1,200 students have applied for a place at the academy, and each year about 20 are accepted. The artists come from all over the world, with less than half from the Netherlands. Artists and art critics are often invited to visit student studios.

Prix de Rome

The academy awards a Prix de Rome to eligible artists and architects. The award originated with the French Prix de Rome in 1666. In 1808 Louis Bonaparte introduced the prize in the Netherlands to promote art, and it was supported by Dutch King William I. Since 1870 the Rijksakademie has made the award, the oldest and most valuable art prize in the Netherlands.

In 1985, the Prix de Rome was reorganised. Prize money was increased, and there were more participating artists; new art categories were added, which change annually. In 2006 its name was changed to "Prix de Rome.nl" and it is awarded in two categories: architecture and fine arts. The prize is €40,000 and a residency in Rome.

Faculty

 Hans Aarsman (born 1951)
 August Allebé (1838–1927), professor in 1870, director 1880–1906
 Nico Bakker (1967–1969)
 Pierre Cuypers (1827–1921)
 Carel Ludewijk Dake (1857–1918)
 Antoon Derkinderen (1859–1925), director after Allebé
 Marinus Heijl (1835–1931)
 Richard Roland Holst (1868–1931), director after Derkinderen
 Johannes Hendricus Jurres (1875–1946)
 Petrus Josephus Lutgers (1808–1874)
 Georg Sturm (1855–1923)
 Charles Verlat (1824–1890)
 Nicolaas van der Waay (1855–1936)
 Gerhard Westermann (1880–1971)
 Petrus van Wijnveld (1820–1902)

Students

 Nico Bakker (1936–1969)
 Tala Madani (1981)
 Ryan Gander (1976)
 Bojan Šarčević (1974)
 Firoz Mahmud (1974)
 Jill Magid (1974)
 Runa Islam (1970)
 Gerard Muller (1861–1929)
 Carlos Amorales (1970)
 Mounir Fatmi (1970)
 Hans Op de Beeck (1969)
 Liu Ye (1964)
 Karel Appel (1921–2006)
 Antonio Vega Macotela (2011–2012)
 Lizzy Ansingh (1875–1959)
 Floris Arntzenius (1864–1925)
 Johan Braakensiek (1858–1940)
 Nicolaas Bastert (1854–1939)
 Tjeerd Bottema (1884–1978)
 George Hendrik Breitner (1857–1923)
 Cornelius de Bruin (1870–1940)
 Constant Anton Nieuwenhuys (1920–2005)
 Antoon Derkinderen (1859–1925)
 Leo Gestel (1881–1941)
 Jan F. Geusebroek (1922–2015)
 Arnold Marc Gorter (1866–1933)
 Richard Roland Holst (1868–1938)
 Isaac Israëls (1865–1934)
 Cornelius Jetses (1873–1955)
 Arnold Hendrik Koning (1860–1945)
 Hendrik Maarten Krabbé (1868–1931)
 Lambert Lourijsen (1885–1950)
 Jacobus van Looy (1855–1930)
 Kees Maks (1876–1967)
 Bjarne Melgaard (1967)
 Samuel Jessurun de Mesquita (1868–1944)
 Wally Moes (1856–1918)
 Piet Mondrian (1872–1944)
 Anthon van Rappard (1858–1892)
 Suze Robertson (1855–1922)
 Gerda Rubinstein (1931–2022)
 Jan Sluyters (1891–1957)
 Hobbe Smith (1862–1942)
 Chavalit Soemprungsuk (1939–2020)
 Jo Bauer-Stumpff (1873–1964)
 Willem Bastiaan Tholen (1860–1931)
 Jan Toorop (1858–1928)
 Jan Pieter Veth (1864–1925)
 Nicolaas van der Waay (1855–1936)
 Gerhard Westermann (1880–1971)
 Maurits van der Valk (1857–1935)
 Petrus Theodorus van Wijngaerdt (1873–1964)
 Jan Hillebrand Wijsmuller (1855–1925)
 Ernst Witkamp (1854–1897)
 Willem Witsen (1860–1923)

See also 
 Prix de Rome

References

External links
 Official website 
 Official website in english 
 Prix de Rome 
 Mondrian Fund 

Buildings and structures in Amsterdam
Culture in Amsterdam
Arts in the Netherlands
1870 establishments in the Netherlands
Education in Amsterdam
Educational institutions established in 1870
19th-century architecture in the Netherlands